Niangua Township is an inactive township in Webster County, in the U.S. state of Missouri.

Niangua Township was formed on February 7, 1888, taking its name from the Niangua River.

References

Townships in Missouri
Townships in Webster County, Missouri